D70 is a state road connecting the Omiš on the Adriatic coast the A1 motorway in Blato na Cetini interchange.

Beyond the interchange the D70 road extends as county road Ž6263 to Blato na Cetini, as the northern terminus of the road is located within the interchange itself.

The road, as well as all other state roads in Croatia, is managed and maintained by Hrvatske ceste, a state-owned company.

Traffic volume 

The D70 state road traffic volume is not reported by Hrvatske ceste. However, they regularly count and report traffic volume on the A1 motorway Blato na Cetini interchange, which connects to the D534 road only, thus permitting the D534 road traffic volume to be accurately calculated. The report includes no information on ASDT volumes.

Road junctions and populated areas

Sources

D070
D070